Brilliant Creatures is a children's wildlife TV show that aired in the UK on ITV's children's slot CITV between 1998 and 2003. It was produced by The Foundation, and was distributed by Entertainment Rights overseas. The original presenters were Terry Nutkins and Gail McKenna. Presenters in later series included Chris Rogers in series 2 and from series 4, the show was revamped with a new logo and a new format. It then continued to be presented by McKenna and Stephen Mulhern until the series end. The show was repeated on the CITV channel until 2012.

Series Guide 

 Series 1 - 7 editions – 13 July 1998 – 24 August 1998
 Series 2 - 7 editions – 12 July 1999 – 23 August 1999
 Series 3 - 7 editions – 25 July 2000 – 5 September 2000
 Series 4 - 10 editions 4 June 2001 – 15 June 2001
 Series 5 - 10 editions 12 June 2002 – 2 August 2002
 Series 6 - 10 editions 7 January 2004 – 10 March 2004

References

External links 

Neverhappendco.uk/brilliantcreatures/ser4/home.html Brilliant Creatures] archive (The Foundation)
Brilliant Creatures title sequence (Gizmo Animation)

(Sources: BFI, The Foundation)

1990s British children's television series
2000s British children's television series
1998 British television series debuts
2003 British television series endings
British children's television series
ITV children's television shows
Television series about animals